From Nowhere is the debut album by the English band The Troggs, released in 1966. It was released with an alternative track listing as Wild Thing in the United States.

The original From Nowhere album sleeve photo was taken at Cheddar Caves, Somerset, UK, on 22 May 1966.

The album was re-released in 2003 with an altered track list and five bonus tracks by Repertoire Records.

Track listing

"From Nowhere" UK original track listing

"Wild Thing" US original track listing

Side 1
"Wild Thing" (Chip Taylor) – 2:34
"From Home" (Reg Presley) – 2:20
"I Just Sing" (Reg Presley) – 2:09
"Hi Hi Hazel" (Bill Martin/Phil Coulter) – 2:43
"Lost Girl" (Reg Presley) – 2:31
"Evil" (Shelby S. Singleton Jr.) – 3:12

Side 2
"With A Girl Like You" (Reg Presley) – 2:05
"Our Love Will Still Be There" (Reg Presley) – 3:08
"Jingle Jangle" (Reg Presley) – 2:26
"When I'm With You" (Reg Presley) – 2:23
"Your Love" (Larry Page/Michael Julien) – 1:52
"I Want You" (Larry Page/Colin Frechter) – 2:13

2003 CD re-issue
"Wild Thing" (Chip Taylor) – 2:34
"The Yella in Me" (Reg Presley) – 2:38
"I Just Sing" (Reg Presley) – 2:09
"Hi Hi Hazel" (Bill Martin/Phil Coulter) – 2:43
"Lost Girl" (Reg Presley) – 2:31
"The Jaguar and the Thunderbird" (Chuck Berry) – 2:01
"Your Love" (Larry Page/Michael Julien) – 1:52
"Our Love Will Still Be There" (Reg Presley) – 3:08
"Jingle Jangle" (Reg Presley) – 2:26
"When I'm With You" (Reg Presley) – 2:23
"From Home" (Reg Presley) – 2:20
"Louie Louie" (Richard Berry) – 3:01
"The Kitty Cat Song" (Jimmy Roach/Joe Spendel) – 2:11
"Ride Your Pony" (Naomi Neville; nom de plume of Allen R. Toussaint) – 2:24
"Evil" (Shelby S. Singleton Jr.) – 3:13
"With A Girl Like You" (Reg Presley) – 2:05*
"I Want You" (Larry Page/Colin Frechter) – 2:13*
"I Can't Control Myself" (Reg Presley) – 3:03*
"Gonna Make You" (Larry Page/Colin Frechter) – 2:46*
"As I Ride By" (Ronnie Bond) – 2:02*
* Bonus tracks

Personnel
Reg Presley – lead vocals, ocarina
Chris Britton – guitar, backing vocals
Pete Staples – bass, backing vocals
Ronnie Bond – drums

References

1966 debut albums
The Troggs albums
Fontana Records albums
Atco Records albums
Repertoire Records albums